Vaazha Vaitha Deivam is 1959 Indian Tamil-language romantic drama film, directed by M. A. Thirumugam, produced by Sandow M. M. A. Chinnappa Thevar and written by Aaroor Dass with music by K. V. Mahadevan. It stars Gemini Ganesan and B. Saroja Devi, with T. S. Balaiah, V. K. Ramasamy, S. V. Subbaiah, P. Kannamba and T. P. Muthulakshmi in supporting roles. The film was released on 28 August 1959 and emerged a box office success.

Plot

Cast 
 Gemini Ganesan
 B. Saroja Devi
 T. S. Balaiah
 P. Kannamba
 S. V. Subbaiah
 T. P. Muthulakshmi
 V. K. Ramasamy
 K. Malathi
 V. R. Rajagopal
 G. Sakunthala
 T. S. Muthaiah
 Sandow M. M. A. Chinnappa Thevar
 Master Murali

Production 
Vaazha Vaitha Deivam was the first film for Aaroor Dass as a "full fledged story and dialogue writer". At his suggestion, Gemini Ganesan and B. Saroja Devi were cast as the lead pair. According to T. S. Balaiah's son Junior Balaiah, when Thevar named this film, "he said he had [T. S.] Balaiah in mind".

Soundtrack 
Music was by K. V. Mahadevan and lyrics were written by Thanjai N. Ramaiah Dass, A. Maruthakasi, Pattukkottai Kalyanasundaram, A. S. Narayanan and Kovai Kumaradevan.

Release 
Vaazha Vaitha Deivam was released on 28 August 1959, and emerged a box office success. It was dubbed into Telugu as Karmika Vijayam, which did not meet with the same success.

References

External links 
 

1959 films
1950s Tamil-language films
Indian black-and-white films
Films scored by K. V. Mahadevan
1959 romantic drama films
Indian romantic drama films
Films directed by M. A. Thirumugam